The Throne of England is the throne of the Monarch of England.  "Throne of England" also refers metonymically to the office of monarch, and monarchy itself. The term "Throne of Great Britain" has been used in reference to Sovereign's Throne in the House of Lords, from which a monarch gives his or her speech at the State opening of Parliament.

History   
The English Throne is one of the oldest continuing hereditary monarchies in the world.  In much the same sense as The Crown, the Throne of England becomes an abstract metonymic concept that represents the legal authority for the existence of the government. It evolved naturally as a separation of the literal throne and property of the nation-state from the person and personal property of the monarch.

According to tradition, the roots of British monarchy extend into legends before the ninth-century king Alfred the Great. On 1 May 1707, the Kingdom of Great Britain was created by the political union of the Kingdom of England and the Kingdom of Scotland.  In this period, the "Throne of the United Kingdom" was merged in usage with the "Throne of England."

The modern King or Queen is a constitutional monarch, and the 20th century governmental policies of devolution have accorded new emphasis on the Throne of England and the Throne of Scotland.

The fungible meanings of "Throne of England" encompass the modern monarchy and the chronological list of legendary and historical monarchs of England, Scotland and the United Kingdom.

Rhetorical usage

This flexible English term is also a rhetorical trope.  Depending on context, the Throne of England can be construed as a metonymy, which is a rhetorical device for an allusion relying on proximity or correspondence, as for example referring to actions of the king or queen or as "actions of the throne."  The throne is also understood as a synecdoche, which is related to metonymy and metaphor in suggesting a play on words by identifying a closely related conceptualisation, e.g.,

 referring to a part with the name of the whole, such as "the throne" for the mystic process of transferring monarchic authority.
 referring to the whole with the name of a part, such as "the throne" for the serial symbols and ceremonies of enthronement.
 referring to the general with the specific, such as "the throne" for kingship.
 referring to the specific with the general, such as "the throne" for the short reign of Edward VIII or equally as well for the ambit of the British monarchy.

See also
 Coronation Chair
 The Crown
 List of English monarchs
 List of Scottish monarchs
 National emblem
Dragon Throne of the Emperors of China
 Chrysanthemum Throne of the Emperors of Japan
 Phoenix Throne of the Kings of Korea
 Lion Throne of the Dalai Lama of Tibet 
 Peacock Throne of the Mughal Empire 
 Peacock Throne of the Persian Empire
 Naderi Throne in Iran
 Silver Throne – the Throne of Sweden
Thailand Throne - the Throne of Thailand

Notes

References
 Gordon, Delahay. (1760). A General History of the Lives, Trials, and Executions of All the Royal and Noble Personages, that Have Suffered in Great-Britain and Ireland for High Treason, Or Other Crimes: From the Accession of Henry VIII. to the Throne of England, Down to the Present Time. London: J. Burd. OCLC 22644648
 Jeudwine, John Wynne. (1912). The First Twelve Centuries of British Story: A Slight Sketch and Criticism of the Social and Political Conditions in the British Islands (herein Called Britain) from the Year 56 B.C. to the Accession of Henry II to the Throne of England in 1154 A.D. London: Longmans, Green. OCLC 1356980
 Russell, John. (1844). History of England: With Separate Historical Sketches of Scotland, Wales, and Ireland; from the Invasion of Julius Cæsar Until the Accession of Queen Victoria to the British Throne. Philadelphia: Hogan & Thompson. OCLC 31202216
 Shawcross, William. (2002). Queen and Country: The Fifty-year Reign of Elizabeth II. New York: Simon & Schuster. 
 Williams, David. (1858). The preceptor's assistant, or, Miscellaneous questions in general history, literature, and science. London: By Simpkin, Marshall. OCLC 63065688

Monarchy
Thrones
National symbols of England